Platydoris annulata is a species of sea slug, a dorid nudibranch, shell-less marine opisthobranch gastropod mollusks in the family Discodorididae.

Distribution
It was reported from the Andaman Sea at depths of 303-313 m.

References

Discodorididae
Gastropods described in 2002